The 1944 Wichita Shockers football team was an American football team that represented Wichita University (now known as Wichita State University) as an independent during the 1944 college football season. In its first season under head coach Melvin J. Binford, the team compiled a 5–2–1 record.

The team was led on offense by halfback Linwood Sexton, one of the first African-Americans to play for Wichita.

Schedule

References

Wichita
Wichita State Shockers football seasons
Wichita football